1946 in professional wrestling describes the year's events in the world of professional wrestling.

List of notable promotions 
Only one promotion held notable shows in 1946.

Calendar of notable shows

Notable events
Dory Detton starts the Western States Sports professional wrestling promotion based in Amarillo, Texas.

Accomplishments and tournaments

EMLL

Championship changes

EMLL

Debuts
Debut date uncertain:
Arnold Skaaland
Stu Hart
June  Enrique Torres

Births
Date of birth unknown:
David Crockett (wrestling)
Jose Estrada Sr. 
January 11  Haruka Eigen (died in 2016) 
January 18  Perro Aguayo( died in 2019) 
March 10  George Julio 
March 14  Don Bass (wrestler) (died in 2016) 
March 15  Yoshihiro Momota (died in 2000) 
March 18  José González (wrestler)
May 19  André the Giant( died in 1993)
May 22  El Solitario(died in 1986)
June 14  Bruiser Brody(died in 1988)
August 16  Dick Murdoch(died in 1996)
September 11  Chabela Romero(died in 1985)
September 18  Otis Sistrunk 
September 19  Jerry Brisco
September 20  Tony Garea
October 4  Phil Hickerson
October 6  Don Ross (died in 1995)
October 10  Giant Haystacks(died in 1998)
November 15  Masanobu Kurisu 
November 25  Johnny Valiant(died in 2018)
December 6  Dennis Stamp(died in 2017)
December 7:
 Billy McGuire (died in 1979)
 Benny McGuire (died in 2001) 
December 9  Kato Kung Lee(died in 2016)

Deaths
June 10 - Jack Johnson (boxer) (68)

References

 
professional wrestling